The 2013 AFL season is the Gold Coast Suns' third season in the Australian Football League (AFL). The Gold Coast Suns reserves team also competed in the NEAFL. The club was again captained by Gary Ablett, Jr. and coached by Guy McKenna.

Draft picks 

 The mini-draft allowed teams to pre-list players for the following season.

Transactions

Overview

Trades

Free Agents

Additions

Re-signings
Re-signings made in 2012.

Delistings
Delistings made in November 2012

Contract Lengths
Contract lengths at the beginning of 2013.

2013 Playing List

2013 Coaches Panel

Guernsey 

 Home Guernsey - The Gold Coast Football Club continued to use the same home guernsey they did in 2011 and 2012.
 Away Guernsey - The Gold Coast Football Club continued to use the same away guernsey they did in 2011 and 2012.
 Clash Guernsey - The new clash guernsey was revealed in February 2013 and was worn for the first time in the Gold Coast's second pre-season game against the Brisbane Lions.

Pre-season results

Home and Away season

Season Summary

Games

Ladder

Ladder progress

Season statistics

Home attendance

Top 5 Goal Scorers

Awards

Brownlow Medal

Gold Coast Club Champion

Other Awards

Representative honours

Indigenous All-Stars Game

Indigenous All-Stars

International Rules

Australia

NEAFL season

Results

NEAFL Ladder

																		
																		
FINALS

References

External links 

Gold Coast Suns
Gold Coast Suns seasons